FL or variations may refer to:

Businesses and organizations 
 AirTran Airways (IATA airline code), defunct American airline
 FL Group, an Icelandic investment company with an emphasis on flight and tourism industry
 Foot Locker (ticker symbol), retailer

Numismatics 
 Florin (disambiguation), various coins
 Guilder, various coins also sometimes called "florin"

Places 
 Florida (United States postal abbreviation)
 Liechtenstein (Fürstentum Liechtenstein)

Science and technology

Biology and medicine
FLT3LG (Fms-related tyrosine kinase 3 ligand), a protein
 Fluffy transcription factor, gene of Neurospora crassa
 Fluorouracil (5-FU), and leucovorin (folinic acid), a chemotherapy regimen for treating colon cancer
 Follicular lymphoma in medicine
 Frontal lobe, the largest brain lobe

Mathematics and computing
 FL (complexity), a class of functions in complexity theory
 FL (programming language), a functional programming language
 Adobe Flash Professional, software which uses "Fl" as its icon abbreviation
 FL Studio, a music production software program

Other uses in science and technology
 Femtolitre, a metric unit of volume
 Flerovium, symbol Fl, a chemical element
 Flight level, a standard nominal altitude of an aircraft, in hundreds of feet
 "Fluid", as in fluid ounce (fl oz)
 Foot-lambert, a unit of luminance
 Friedmann–Lemaître metric in cosmology

Sport
 Federal League, a United States baseball league in 1914
 English Football League, the governing body of two of the leagues in the English football pyramid

Genealogy 
 Floruit (abbreviated fl.), Latin for he/she flourished, referring to a time period in which someone was known to be alive or active

Other uses 
  (fl), a typographical ligature
 Flavius, a gens (family name) or praenomen (personal name) in ancient Rome
 Flawless, a grade of diamond clarity
 Fork length, a standard fish measurement
 Free List (Liechtenstein), a center-left political party in Liechtenstein
Volvo FL, a medium weight truck developed by Volvo

See also 
 FLS (disambiguation)